Parietin is the predominant cortical pigment of lichens in the genus Caloplaca, a secondary product of the lichen Xanthoria parietina, and a pigment found in the roots of Curled Dock (Rumex crispus). It has an orangy-yellow color and absorbs blue light.

It is also known as physcion.

It has also been shown to protect lichens against UV-B light, at high altitudes in Alpine regions. The UV-B light stimulates production of parietin and the parietin protects the lichens from damage. Lichens in arctic regions such as Svarlbard retain this capability though they do not encounter damaging levels of UV-B, a capability that could help protect the lichens in case of Ozone layer thinning.

It has also shown anti-fungal activity against barley powdery mildew and cucumber powdery mildew, more efficiently in the latter case than treatments with fenarimol and polyoxin B.

It reacts with KOH to form a deep, reddish-magenta compound.

Effect on human cancer cells
Also found in rhubarb,  the orange compound appears to have potential to suppress 6-phosphogluconate dehydrogenase, or 6PGD.  6PGD is the third enzyme of the pentose phosphate pathway, or PPP, an oxidative process fueling growth in a still-relatively-unknown way. But it appears that arresting the chemical machinery at its third step could be promising for oncology.  The parietin, identified from an FDA database of 2,000 known suppressors of 6PGD, killed half the human leukemia cells over two days in the laboratory. The pigment also slowed the growth of other human cancer cells in mouse models, according to the study. A more-potent derivative of the parietin called S3 may even cut the growth of lung cancer cells implanted in mice by two-thirds, over the course of 11 days.  The compound also appears to be non-toxic to healthy cells.

References

 Caloplaca coralloides chemistry
 
 

Anthraquinone dyes
Antifungals
Dihydroxyanthraquinones
Phenol ethers
Lichen products